As Man Desires is a 1925 American silent drama film directed by Irving Cummings and starring Viola Dana. It was produced and distributed by First National Pictures.

Plot
As described in a review in a film magazine, Major John Craig (Sills) knocks out Colonel Carringford (Nicholson) when he discovers Gloria Gordon (Clifford), his fiancée, has been untrue. Carringford is then murdered by a servant and because Evelyn Beaudine (Theby), a married woman of unsavory reputation, accuses him of the crime, Craig is forced to flee from his British Army post in India. Craig procures a fishing smack and amasses wealth from working pearl beds in the South Seas. He tenders Gorilla Bagsley (Kennedy), a poacher a beating when he finds him annoying Pandora (Dana). She now feels that Craig is "her man" and, to spite the memory of the other woman, he marries her. A seaman identifies Craig and notifies the British government. Gloria comes with the representative who tells Craig that Gloria had sacrificed her own reputation to prove his innocence. Gorilla, intending to kill Craig, levels a gun towards his back but Pandora jumps in the way as it is fired. Craig and Gloria are thus united.

Cast

Preservation
With no prints of As Man Desires located in any film archives, it is a lost film.

References

External links

1925 films
American silent feature films
Lost American films
Films directed by Irving Cummings
First National Pictures films
1925 romantic drama films
American romantic drama films
American black-and-white films
1920s American films
Silent romantic drama films
Silent American drama films